The 2006 Furman Paladins football team was an American football team that represented Furman University as a member of the Southern Conference (SoCon) during the 2006 NCAA Division I FCS football season. In their fifth year under head coach Bobby Lamb, the Paladins compiled an overall record of 8–4 with a conference mark of 6–1, finishing second in the SoCon. Furman advanced to the playoffs, where they were defeated by Montana State in the first round.

Schedule

References

Furman
Furman Paladins football seasons
Furman Paladins football